The Nipigon Embayment is an inactive continental rift zone in Northwestern Ontario, Canada, centered on Lake Nipigon. It represents an aulacogen of the much larger Midcontinent Rift System, which formed some 1,100 million years ago when the North American craton began to split apart during the Proterozoic eon.

References

Geology of Ontario
Aulacogens
Mesoproterozoic rifts and grabens